David Francis Germano is an American Tibetologist and Professor of Tibetan and Buddhist Studies at the University of Virginia (UVa), the largest Tibetan Studies program in the Americas, where he has taught and researched since 1992. With dual appointments in the School of Nursing and the Department of Religious Studies, Germano currently oversees the work of over twenty graduate students. He is on the board of the International Association of Tibetan Studies and is Editor-in-Chief of The Journal of the International Association of Tibetan Studies (JIATS), a leading journal of Tibetology. In 2000, he founded the Tibetan and Himalayan Library, a digital initiative for collaborative building of knowledge on the region, which he continues to lead as Director. Since 2008 he has also been the co-director of the  UVa Tibet Center. More recently, Germano acted as the founding director of SHANTI (Sciences, Humanities and the Arts Network of Technological Initiatives) at the UVa. Since 2011, Germano has also played a leading role in organizing the University of Virginia's Contemplative Sciences Center, which he currently directs.

Education 

He received a  Bachelor of Arts (BA) from the University of Notre Dame, and a  Doctor of Philosophy (PhD), from University of Wisconsin–Madison, where he focused in Buddhist Studies and Tibetan Studies. He has also spent over a decade living and studying in various parts of Asia, particularly in regions with high concentrations of Tibetans and other Himalayan Buddhists are located - Tibet, China, Bhutan, India, and Nepal.

Research interests 

Germano's research interests include philosophical and contemplative traditions in Tibet, particularly Dzogchen in the Nyingma and Bön traditions and Tibetan historical literature. He also researches on the contemporary state of Tibetan religion in relationship to China and non-monastic yogic communities in cultural Tibet.  He is currently working on a fourfold set of works constituting a comprehensive analysis of the Great Perfection Seminal Heart (rdzogs chen snying thig) tradition from its early formation to its full expression in the fourteenth century within the works of Longchenpa. This will include a deeply annotated translation of one of Longchenpa's major works, The Treasury of Words and Meanings (tshig don mdzod) and detailed studies of the Seminal Heart tradition itself from historical, philosophical, and literary perspectives respectively.

Publications and academic contributions 

Germano's academic work primarily focuses around two complementary poles: the contours of Nyingma philosophy, doctrine, and practice (particularly as found in the Dzogs chen school) and how these religious lineages have been interacted with, embodied, and understood throughout Tibetan history. Germano is passionate that contemporary academic work support, benefit, and honor the preservation of Tibetan culture and Tibetan ways-of-life today, giving rise to many of his academic projects.  In particular, much of the work David leads at the Tibetan and Himalayan Library has been geared towards not only making academic resources accessible for Tibetans, but also towards mapping and collecting traditional knowledge of Tibetan peoples today. A sampling of the collaborative work Germano leads includes the Tibetan Place Dictionary, the Tibetan Map Collection, and the Tibetan Audio-Video Archive. Beyond these specific projects, Germano organizes several important programs to bring Tibetan thinkers to study in America and facilitate the development of long-lasting academic connections between Tibetan and American scholars, including the University of Virginia Tibetan Entrepreneurs Program and the Education to Employment Initiative.

As part of his interest in supporting contemporary Tibetan peoples, Germano also works to introduce those outside Tibetan cultural areas to the richness and depth of traditional Tibetan culture. He has written numerous encyclopedia articles and annotated textual entries for the Encyclopedia of Religion (Macmillan Reference, 2004) and Religions of Tibet in Practice (Princeton University Press, 1997). He has also been involved with numerous documentary works on traditional Tibetan arts, including the 2004 documentary Tibetan Furniture Making: Traditions and Innovations, produced for the Pacific Asian Art Museum in Los Angeles, CA. In 2014, Germano was the keynote speaker for the Mind and Life Institute conference "Contemplation in Contexts: Tibetan Buddhist Meditation Across the Boundaries of the Humanities and Sciences." Recently, Germano's work as Director of the Contemplative Sciences Center has allowed him to coordinate the interests of numerous innovators, researchers, and scholars to investigate the benefits of contemplative activities. In this context, he has led a larger effort to think about the nature and future of a large public research university in the context of the transformative possibilities offered by contemplative practices, ideas, and values. Germano has also used this position to bring an increasing academic rigor as well as an acknowledgment of the foundational importance of culture to discussions of meditation and contemplation.

Beyond these innovative contributions to academic scholarship and public knowledge, Germano has also edited two volumes and written several articles published in both online and print academic journals. These works continue to explore how Tibetans have practiced and understood Dzogs chen philosophy and cultural identity both throughout history and today.

Edited books

Web 

 
 
 
 David Germano, Nicolas Tournadre: THDL Simplified Phonetic Transcription of Standard Tibetan (Tibetan and Himalayan Digital Library, December 12, 2003)

Articles

References

External links
 

Tibetologists
Living people
American male writers
American translators
University of Notre Dame alumni
University of Wisconsin–Madison College of Letters and Science alumni
University of Virginia faculty
Year of birth missing (living people)